Draco biaro, also known as the Lazell's flying dragon,  is a species of lizard. It is endemic to the Sangihe Islands in North Sulawesi, Indonesia. The type locality is the eponymous Biaro Island. It can be found in lowland rainforests.

References 

biaro
Endemic fauna of Indonesia
Reptiles of Indonesia
Reptiles described in 1987